Jacob's Well in Cliftonwood, Bristol, England is an early medieval structure within a building on the corner of Jacob's Wells Road and Constitution Hill thought to be a Jewish ritual bath.

The stone structure is built round a natural hot spring and on a lintel there is an inscription thought to be the Hebrew word zochalim, "flowing".  This led to the theory that this was a mikveh or Jewish ritual bath.  The interpretation of the inscription was challenged in 2002 and the alternative theory proposed that the bath is too deep for a mikvah and may have been used to cleanse bodies before burial in the nearby Jewish cemetery at Brandon Hill which was established after 1177. A Jewish community was known to exist in Bristol from at least 1154 until the wholesale banishment of the Jewish community from England in 1290.

The spring became the property of St Augustine's Abbey in 1142 and the exterior was rebuilt in the 18th or 19th century. A Royal Commission on the Health of Towns reported in 1845 that nearly all of the water laid into Bristol came from Jacob's Wells. The Commission noted that the water, which also fed the Cathedral and the Grammar School, was of good quality but the volume was not enough to supply the city. In 1905 the natural hot spring was diverted into the Jacobs Wells Baths. Jacob's Well was rediscovered in 1987 by the Bristol Temple Local History Group, who were investigating the site during the rebuilding of a furniture workshop which had been the Hotwells Police Station bicycle shed, and a one-time fire engine house. 

In February 2011, the company that now owns the well applied to the Environment Agency to extract and bottle up to 15 million litres (3.3 million imperial gallons) of water a year. Water from the well was previously bottled and sold in the 1980s.

See also
For other similarly named structures, see Jacob's Well.

References and sources
References

Sources
 J. Hillaby and R. Sermon, Jacob's Well, Bristol: Mikveh or Bet Tohorah?, Transactions of the Bristol and Gloucestershire Archaeological Society 122  (2004) 127–152
 I. Blair, J. Hillaby, I. Howell, R. Sermon and B. Watson, "The discovery of two medieval mikva'ot in London and a reinterpretation of the Bristol 'mikveh'", Jewish Historical Studies (Jewish Historical Society of England) 37 (2001) 15-40
 J. Lea-Jones. Historical account of the area known as Jacob’s Wells, Clifton, Bristol, England: from twelfth century to modern times (1999) 
 S. Watson, Secret underground Bristol (Bristol 1991) 
 J. H. Bettey, "Bristol Observed, Visitors' impressions of the City from Domesday to The Blitz", p79, Redcliffe Press Ltd (1966) .

Buildings and structures in Bristol
Scheduled monuments in Bristol
Jews and Judaism in England